Steve, Steven or Stephen Clifford may refer to:

Steven Clifford, Australian skier
Stephen Clifford, Australian rules footballer
Steve Clifford, American basketball coach